Security perimeter may refer to:

 Access control
 Perimeter fence
 Police perimeter
 Perimeter security